Penetration may refer to:

Science and technology
 Passage through a partition or wall by a wire, cable, or other electrically conductive object
 Penetration (firestop), an opening in a wall or floor assembly required to have a fire-resistance rating, for the purpose of accommodating the passage of a mechanical, electrical, or structural penetrant
 Penetration (weapons), the ability to pierce the target's armor or other protection
 Penetration depth of light or any electromagnetic radiation in a physical medium
 Penetrating trauma, injury that occurs when an object pierces the skin and enters a tissue of the body
 In roofing, pipes, conduits, and HVAC supports passing through the roof
 An unauthorized act of bypassing access control

Arts and media
 Penetration (band), a punk rock band
 "Penetration", a song on Iggy and the Stooges' album Raw Power
 "Penetration", a song on Pedro the Lion's album Control
 "Penetration", a song by The Pyramids
 Body of Lies (film), a film formerly known as Penetration

Other uses
 Penetration (warfare), the breaching of, and moving past, a defensive military line
 Market penetration or brand penetration, the degree to which a product or service is known and/or used
 Sexual penetration, or sexual intercourse
 in some jurisdictions, a criminal charge related to various sexual offences
 In basketball, the ability of a player to drive through the opposition's defense
 In magic, an illusion in which one object appears to pass through another

See also 
 Penetrator (disambiguation)
 Interpenetration (disambiguation)